Keramidia, is a village in the northeastern part of the municipal unit of Amaliada, Elis, Greece. It is located in a rural area near the southwestern corner of the Pineios reservoir, 1 km north of Dafniotissa, 3 km east of Dafni, 3 km south of Agios Ilias, 5 km west of Efyra and 11 km northeast of Amaliada.

Historical population

References

See also
List of settlements in Elis

Populated places in Elis